Ochyrocera ungoliant is a species of spiders of the family Ochyroceratidae. It is endemic to Brazil. It was named after Ungoliant, an evil spider spirit created by J.R.R. Tolkien, described in the book The Silmarillion.

See also
 List of Ochyroceratidae species
 List of things named after J. R. R. Tolkien and his works

References

Ochyroceratidae
Spiders of Brazil
Endemic fauna of Brazil
Spiders described in 2018
The Silmarillion
Organisms named after Tolkien and his works